István Simon (8 December 1912 – 20 July 1995) was a Hungarian long-distance runner. He competed in the men's 5000 metres at the 1936 Summer Olympics.

References

1912 births
1995 deaths
Athletes (track and field) at the 1936 Summer Olympics
Hungarian male long-distance runners
Olympic athletes of Hungary
Place of birth missing
20th-century Hungarian people